Norbert Eilenfeldt (born 17 February 1956 in Gelsenkirchen) is a retired German football player. He spent eight seasons in the Bundesliga with Arminia Bielefeld, 1. FC Kaiserslautern and FC Schalke 04. The best league finish he achieved was fourth place.

References

External links
 

1956 births
Living people
German footballers
Arminia Bielefeld players
1. FC Kaiserslautern players
FC Schalke 04 players
Bundesliga players
2. Bundesliga players
Association football midfielders
Sportspeople from Gelsenkirchen
Footballers from North Rhine-Westphalia